Geodesium is the name of a music project by composer and recording artist Mark C. Petersen.  The word is formed by combining the terms "geodesic dome" and "planetarium" and refers to the space music Petersen creates specifically for use as scores for planetarium shows.

Petersen has produced soundtracks for more than 60 planetarium shows performed in installations in more than 900 planetarium facilities in more than 50 countries around the world. He has performed several live music shows in planetariums in the U.S. and the UK, but he considers his work to be a studio creation and not particularly well-suited to live performances, as his music features multiple electronic musical instruments, difficult to operate in real time.

The music of Geodesium has been featured in planetarium shows narrated by well-known screen personalities including Noah Adams, Baxter Black, Avery Brooks, Roxanne Dawson, Michael Dorn, James Earl Jones,  Leonard Nimoy, William Shatner and Patrick Stewart.  Petersen's music has also appeared in TV commercials for major corporations including AT&T, Ford, Pizza Hut, Honda, Coors, and the Colorado Lottery. and has been featured in a variety of NASA-produced programs, Digistar demonstration shows for Evans & Sutherland, and special-effects laserdiscs for Sky-Skan. Geodesium music has been featured on space music radio programs such as Musical Starstreams, Music from The Hearts of Space, and Opus 357.

History

Petersen's interest in creating music for planetariums was sparked in 1975 when he observed the construction of the planetarium at the University of Colorado.  After sharing some of his Moog synthesizer recordings with the planetarium's designer, Petersen was invited to create the music for the first show at the new facility, and was the composer-in-residence there from 1975 to 1978.

Discography
All released by Loch Ness Productions:
 Geodesium, 1977
 Double Eclipse, 1981
 West of the Galaxy, 1987
 Fourth Universe, 1992
 Anasazi, 1993
 Stellar Collections, 2001
 "'Tis The Season", 2002
 A Gentle Rain Of Starlight, 2007
 "Music From SpacePark360", 2010
 Stella Novus, 2011
 Arcturian Archives, 2011
 Music from Infinity, 2014
 Celestial Rhythms: NYC Live '85, 2015
 Infinite Light, 2019
 Startalk, 2019
 Stellar Collections 2, 2019

External links
Information at Loch Ness Productions 
[ Geodesium] on Allmusic
Geodesium on Discogs
Geodesium on Amazon.com

Footnotes

Electronic music groups
New-age music groups
Planetarium shows